Brachyopa cinerea is a European species of hoverfly.

Distribution
Sweden.

References

Diptera of Europe
Eristalinae
Insects described in 1844
Taxa named by Peter Fredrik Wahlberg